Emmanuele Bergamo (born 12 August 1949) is an Italian racing cyclist. He rode in the 1975 Tour de France.

References

External links
 

1949 births
Living people
Italian male cyclists
Place of birth missing (living people)
Cyclists from the Province of Treviso
20th-century Italian people